"Into the West" is a song performed by Annie Lennox, and the end-credit song of the 2003 film The Lord of the Rings: The Return of the King. It is written by Lennox, Return of the King producer and co-writer Fran Walsh, and composed and co-written by the film's composer Howard Shore. The song plays in full during the closing credits of Return of the King, although instrumental music from the song (which forms the theme of the Grey Havens) plays at other points during the film itself.

The song was later covered by New Zealand singers Yulia Townsend and Will Martin and American singer Peter Hollens. In 2014, German a cappella Metal band van Canto performed a cover on their fifth studio album, Dawn of the Brave.

Style

The original song conceived as the closing credits of the 2003 film The Lord of the Rings: The Return of the King was "Frodo's Song" (which exists only in mock-up form), which became "Use Well the Days," written by Howard Shore. The song was Frodo singing to Sam as he left Middle Earth and includes Frodo’s lament in the middle of book 6 chapter 9 “The Grey Havens." Director Peter Jackson felt that the song wasn't a good fit as a concluding song for the series, so Shore began to try to write a different closing credits song. As he did, Cameron Duncan, a young Māori New Zealand filmmaker whose work had impressed Jackson and his team, was dying from cancer at 16 years old, and his imminent passing inspired Shore, the film writer Fran Walsh, and the Scottish singer Annie Lennox to write "Into the West." The first public performance of the song was at Duncan's funeral.

The melody of the song, "The Grey Havens", is one of the musical themes in Shore's music for the film, representing the Grey Havens on the western shore of Middle-earth, and the land of Valinor that lies beyond the western sea. It is used subtly when Gandalf describes the vision of Valinor to Pippin in Minas Tirith, and later triumphantly as Sam carries Frodo up Mount Doom. It returns in cellos and humming voices during the Grey Havens scenes. The song itself soon follows, with a prominent guitar solo that opens and closes it and continues to accompany the song throughout, and a heartbeat-like motif played by bodhrán drums underneath.

The lyrics by Fran Walsh are based primarily on Legolas's lament at the end of book 6 chapter 4, "The Field of Cormallen" and the parting scene at the Grey Havens and Frodo's experience approaching Eressea and Valinor at the end of book 6 chapter 9 "The Grey Havens".

Versions

The song has five different versions, in addition to the one used in Return of the King (with the orchestral ending). Promos were made available in late November 2003. The versions, with their playing times, are: 

 the album version – 4:35
 the radio edit – 3:59
 the acoustic edit – 4:05
 the acoustic version – 4:39
 the version without the orchestral ending – 4:34
 the film version with the orchestral ending - 5:48

Accolades

The song won the Academy Award for Best Original Song at the 76th Academy Awards, one of Return of the King's eleven wins. Lennox also performed the song live at the ceremony. Lennox's performance was one of several introduced by Liv Tyler, who appeared as Arwen in the film.

Personnel

 Annie Lennox - vocals
 John Parricelli - guitar
 Dermot Crehan - hardingfele, fiddle, violin
 Ulrich Herkenhoff - flute

References

2003 songs
Annie Lennox songs
Best Original Song Golden Globe winning songs
Best Original Song Academy Award-winning songs
Grammy Award for Best Song Written for Visual Media
The Lord of the Rings (film series) music
Songs written by Annie Lennox
Songs with lyrics by Fran Walsh
Songs written by Howard Shore
New-age songs
Reprise Records singles